Gold and Black (1972−1999) was a New Zealand-bred racehorse which was ridden by Johnny Duggan to win the 1977 Melbourne Cup for the "Cups King" Bart Cummings.

In 1976, Gold and Black won the Mackinnon Stakes and finished second to Van der Hum in the Melbourne Cup. In early 1977, Gold and Black fell seriously ill with "travel fatigue" and his life was briefly in danger but Cummings restored the horse to health for his spring campaign. At Flemington in November Gold and Black started 7/2 favourite for the Cup. Carrying a weight of 57kg he won by a length from the Australian horse Reckless with Hyperno in third. His victory gave Cummings a record sixth win in the race.

References

1972 racehorse births
1999 racehorse deaths
Racehorses bred in New Zealand
Racehorses trained in Australia
Melbourne Cup winners
Thoroughbred family 3-e